Herbert Rettensteiner (born 26 August 1948) is a retired Austrian football goalkeeper who played for Austria. He also played for SSW Innsbruck, SK VÖEST Linz and SV Austria Salzburg.

External links

 
 

1948 births
Austrian footballers
Austria international footballers
Association football goalkeepers
FC Wacker Innsbruck players
FC Red Bull Salzburg players
Living people
People from St. Johann im Pongau District
Footballers from Salzburg (state)